The relationship between alcohol and weight is the subject of inconclusive studies. Findings of these studies range from increase in body weight to a small decrease among women who begin consuming alcohol. Some of these studies are conducted with numerous subjects; one involved nearly 80,000 and another 140,000 subjects.

Findings are inconclusive because alcohol itself contains seven calories per gram, but research suggests that alcohol energy is not efficiently used. Alcohol also appears to increase metabolic rate significantly, thus causing more calories to be burned rather than stored in the body as fat (Klesges et al., 1994).

According to Kent Bunting, the research results do not necessarily mean that people who wish to lose weight should continue to consume alcohol because consumption is known to have an enhancing effect on appetite. Due to these discrepancies in findings, the relationship between alcohol and weight remains unresolved and requires further research.

Biological and environmental factors are thought to contribute to alcoholism and obesity. The physiologic commonalities between excessive eating and excessive alcohol drinking shed light on intervention strategies, such as pharmaceutical compounds that may help those who suffer from both.
Some of the brain signaling proteins that mediate excessive eating and weight gain also mediate uncontrolled alcohol consumption. Some physiological substrates that underlie food intake and alcohol intake have been identified. Melanocortins, a group of signaling proteins, are found to be involved in both excessive food intake and alcohol intake.

Certain patterns of alcohol use may contribute to obesity. A study found frequent, light drinkers (three to seven drinking days per week, one drink per drinking day) had lower BMIs than infrequent, but heavier drinkers. Although calories in liquids containing ethanol may fail to trigger the physiologic mechanism that produces the feeling of fullness in the short term, long-term, frequent drinkers may compensate for energy derived from ethanol by eating less.

References

External links

Nutrition Information for alcoholic beverages

Weight